Azadinium is a genus of dinoflagellates belonging to the family Amphidomataceae.

Species:

Azadinium asperum 
Azadinium caudatum 
Azadinium concinnum

References

Dinophyceae
Dinoflagellate genera